Ibidionini (a.k.a. Hexoplonini & Neoibidionini) is a tribe of beetles in the subfamily Cerambycinae.

Genera
BioLib includes:

 Acangarana Nascimento & Bravo, 2018
 Acangassu Galileo & Martins, 2001
 Alcyopis Pascoe, 1866
 Aneuthetochorus Martins, 1968
 Aphatum Bates, 1870
 Asynapteron Martins, 1970
 Bezarkia Martins & Galileo, 2014
 Biraidion Galileo & Santos-Silva, 2016
 Bomaribidion Martins, 1962
 Brechmoidion Martins, 1969
 Calycibidion Martins, 1971
 Cecaibidion Galileo & Martins, 2001
 Cephaloplon Martins & Napp, 1986
 Chiquitano Santos-Silva, Galileo & Wappes, 2017
 Cicatrion Martins, 1970
 Coleroidion Martins, 1969
 Compsa (beetle) Perty, 1832
 Compsibidion Thomson, 1864
 Corimbion Martins, 1970
 Ctenoplon Martins, 1967
 Cycnidolon Thomson, 1864
 Diasporidion Martins, 1968
 Dodecaibidion Martins, 1962
 Engyum Thomson, 1864
 Epacroplon Martins, 1962
 Glomibidion Napp & Martins, 1985
 Glyptoceridion Martins, 1959
 Glyptoscapus Aurivillius, 1899
 Gnomibidion Martins, 1968
 Gnomidolon Thomson, 1864
 Hadroibidion Martins, 1967
 Heterachthes Newman, 1840
 Heterocompsa Martins, 1965
 Hexocycnidolon Martins, 1960
 Hexoplon Thomson, 1864
 Homaloidion Martins, 1968
 Hormathus Gahan, 1890
 Ibidion Audinet-Serville, 1834
 Isostenygra Martins & Galileo, 1999
 Kolonibidion Martins, 2009
 Kunaibidion Giesbert, 1998
 Megaceron Martins, 1969
 Megapedion Martins, 1968
 Microibidion Martins, 1962
 Minibidion Martins, 1968
 Monzonia Giesbert, 1998
 Neocompsa Martins, 1965
 Neoctoplon Martins, 1969
 Neognomidolon Martins, 1967
 Neopotiatuca Martins & Galileo, 2007
 Neotropidion Martins, 1968
 Notosphaeridion Martins, 1960
 Opacibidion Martins, 1968
 Ophtalmibidion Martins, 1969
 Ophtalmoplon Martins, 1965
 Opsibidion Martins, 1960
 Palpibidion Martins & Galileo, 2003
 Paracompsa Martins, 2009
 Paratetroplon Audureau, 2015
 Perissomerus Gounelle, 1909
 Phocibidion Martins, 1968
 Pronoplon Martins, 1967
 Prothoracibidion Martins, 1960
 Pseudoplon Martins, 1971
 Psiloibidion Martins, 1968
 Pubescibidion Martins, 2009
 Pygmodeon Martins, 1970
 Rhysium Pascoe, 1866
 Smaragdion Martins, 1968
 Spinoplon Napp & Martins, 1985
 Stenoidion Martins, 1970
 Stenygra Audinet-Serville, 1834
 Sydax Lacordaire, 1869
 Tapuruia Lane, 1973
 Tetraibidion Martins, 1967
 Tetraopidion Martins, 1960
 Tetroplon Aurivillius, 1899
 Thoracibidion Martins, 1960
 Trichoplon Martins, 1967
 Tropidion Thomson, 1867
 Uirassu Martins & Galileo, 2010
 Xalitla Lane, 1959

References

External links

Ibidionini
Cerambycinae